The 2014–15 Algerian Ligue Professionnelle 2 will be the 49th season of the Algerian Ligue Professionnelle 2 since its establishment, and its fourth season under its current title. A total of 16 teams will contest the league.

Team overview

Stadia and locations

League table

Results table

Season statistics

Top scorers

See also
 2014–15 Algerian Ligue Professionnelle 1
 2014–15 Algerian Cup

References

Algerian Ligue 2 seasons
2
Algeria